The Naga People's Front (NPF) is a regional political party in Nagaland, Manipur and Arunachal Pradesh . It headed the Nagaland government with the Bharatiya Janata Party, as part of the Democratic Alliance of Nagaland from 2003 to 2018. NPF is coalition partner of N. Biren Singh ministry led BJP government in Manipur.

Dr. Shürhozelie Liezietsu is the President of the party. Awangbow Newmai is State unit President of the party in Manipur while Losii Dikho is the Legislature Party Leader of NPF in Manipur Legislative Assembly. Neiphiu Rio, the Lok Sabha member from the lone constituency of Nagaland was the leader of the party till 16 January 2018. T. R. Zeliang became the party leader till April 29, 2022. The current party leader is Kuzholuzo Nienu.

On 22 March 2004, the NPF absorbed the Nagaland Democratic Party.

History 
Prior to October 2002, the party was known as Nagaland People's Council (NPC). The name of the party was changed from Nagaland People's Council (NPC) to Naga People's Front (NPF) in the Ninth General Convention held at Kohima in October 2002. This historic decision found wide acceptance among the people of the state, as a popular wish of the state was to modify the leadership of the state and make it more inclusive.

In Nagaland, both the ruling Naga People's Front and the opposition party, the UPA, supported Pranab Mukherjee during the 2012 presidential election. Mukherjee held a meeting with Neiphiu Rio and DAN legislators in Dimapur where NPF leaders formally endorsed their support.

Mukherjee won the election on 19 July 2012. When the Nagaland Post asked the Chief Minister, Neiphiu Rio, if the support extended to the presidential candidate was also "issue based" as the NPF-led DAN was supporting the UPA government at the centre on the same line, the Chief Minister said that his party was supporting the UPA and hence it was the right perspective that the DAN legislators also support UPA’s presidential nominee. NPF's main opposition in the legislative assembly is the Indian National Congress party.

Although the Naga People's Front has local arrangements with the NDA it previously had not support either the NDA or the UPA in the central government where it has 1 MP in the Lok Sabha.

For the 2014 General Election, the North-East Regional Political Front (NERPF), a consortium of 10 regional parties, including the Naga People's Front announced their support for the NDA.

Currently the NPF is a part of North-East Regional Political Front consisting of political parties of the northeast which has supported the National Democratic Alliance (India).

On 11 May 2015, all of the assembly's Congress MLAs joined the NPF.

46 MLAs from the 60 member Nagaland Legislative Assembly are from the NPF. The opposition, Congress, is represented by 18 MLAs and the rest of the assembly consists of 7 independent MLAs.

In May 2016, after the Bharatiya Janata Party led National Democratic Alliance formed its first government in Assam, a new alliance called the North-East Democratic Alliance (NEDA) was formed with Himanta Biswa Sarma as its convener. The Chief Ministers of the north eastern states of Sikkim, Assam, Arunachal Pradesh and Nagaland too belong to this alliance. Thus, the Naga People's Front joined the BJP led NEDA.
On 18 May 2019, NPF pulled out of NDA Government in Manipur. After 2022 Manipur Legislative Assembly election, NPF rejoined NDA Government in Manipur.

Aims and Objectives
The aims and objectives of the Naga Peoples Front are:

(a) To work and assist in any possible manner on any approach for a peaceful solution of the Indo-Naga political issue, keeping alive at the same time the fire of relentless endeavour to stand against any force to further divide the Nagas and thereby move towards a renaissance of Naga brotherhood by making constant appeal to Naga conscience.
(b) To strive to bring about electoral reforms suited to our way of life aimed at a national resurgence in the society towards whom the Party is duty bound and thereby to liberate the Naga society from the deadly clutches of degeneration.
(c) To work for unity and integrity of the people by integrating all contiguous Naga inhabited areas under one administrative roof and also to provide protection to all the ethnic groups who are indigenous inhabitants of the State.
(d) To restore the good name and clean image which the Nagas enjoyed in the past by taking the fight against all forms of corruption at all levels of Government.
(e) To restore to the people the self-discipline and the spirit of self-reliance which the Nagas had in abundance in the past but which have been seriously eroded in the recent past.
(f) To work for economic advancement of the people with special emphasis on rural development with a view to removing economic disparity in the society.
(g) To strive for a clean and efficient administration.
(h) To strictly abide by the Rule of Law in the dispensation of Justice.

List of Chief Ministers

See also
Vatsu Meru
Rokonicha
Y. Hewoto Awomi

References

External links
Constitution of the Nagaland People's Front

 
Political parties in Nagaland
Recognised state political parties in India
Political parties established in 2002
2002 establishments in Nagaland